The 2011 Skate Canada International was the second event of six in the 2011–12 ISU Grand Prix of Figure Skating, a senior-level international invitational competition series. It was held at the Hershey Centre in Mississauga, Ontario on October 27–30. Medals were awarded in the disciplines of men's singles, ladies' singles, pair skating, and ice dancing. Skaters earned points toward qualifying for the 2011–12 Grand Prix Final.

Eligibility
Skaters who reached the age of 14 by July 1, 2011 were eligible to compete on the senior Grand Prix circuit.

In July 2011, minimum score requirements were added to the Grand Prix series and were set at two-thirds of the top scores at the 2011 World Championships. Prior to competing in a Grand Prix event, skaters were required to earn the following:

Entries
The entries were as follows. Nathalie Péchalat and Fabian Bourzat withdrew on October 26 due to Bourzat's bronchitis.

Schedule
All times are Eastern Daylight Time (UTC -04:00).

 Thursday, October 27
 11:00–16:30 – Practices
 Friday, October 28
 08:30–14:00 – Practices
 14:05–15:25 – Ladies' short program
 15:45–16:55 – Pairs' short program
 18:30–19:00 – Welcome ceremonies
 19:30–20:50 – Men's short program
 21:10–22:20 – Ice dancing short dance
 Saturday, October 29
 07:30–13:45 – Practices
 14:15–15:50 – Ladies' free skating
 16:15–17:35 – Pairs' free skating
 17:45 – Medal presentations: Ladies/Pairs
 19:10–20:50 – Men's free skating
 21:00 – Medal presentation: Men
 Sunday, October 30
 09:00–11:25 – Practices
 12:30 – Free dance
 13:55 – Medal presentation: Ice dancing
 15:00–16:50 – Exhibition gala

Results

Men

Ladies

Pairs

Ice dancing

References

External links

 
 2011 Skate Canada: Entries at the International Skating Union
 2011 Skate Canada International at Skate Canada

Skate Canada International, 2011
Skate Canada International
Skate Canada International
Skate Canada International
Skate Canada International
Sport in Mississauga